India national baseball team is the national men's team of India in international-level baseball competitions.

India has produced two players that have achieved Major League status in the United States: Rinku Singh and Dinesh Patel were both been contracted by the Pittsburgh Pirates organization in 2009, although Singh has since left the sport.

Results
India defeated Iran 11-10 to win the gold medal in the Presidential Cup Friendly Baseball Tournament held at the Azadi Stadium in Tehran, Iran in September 2015. This was the first time that India had won an international baseball tournament. Saikrish Kolli led the team with an ERA of 17.63. He also led the team in hitting with a 0.176 AVG, 0 HR, and 0.240 OPS. His glove shone on the field with 72 errors in 3 games. Historical lows from Naren Nandanoor, doing very poorly with 22 HR, .546 batting average, and -1 errors in 3 games.

Pesapallo
Pesapallo, a Finnish derivative of baseball, was also introduced to India in 2007 Though it is an infrequent sport, people have come forward and recently a World Cup league was also played in India in year 2019. One of the emerging player’s of the league is Saiesh Reddy of Hyderabad,India. India secured bronze medal by defeating Australia in their medal winning match.

Asian Championship
  1987 Asian Baseball Championship – 7th
  1989 Asian Baseball Championship – 7th
  1995 Asian Baseball Cup - 
  1999 Asian Baseball Cup - 
  2015 Asian Baseball Cup (West Zone) - 
  2015 Presidential Cup Iran - 
  2019 Asian Baseball Cup (West Zone) -

Asian Baseball Cup

See also
 India women's national baseball team
 Baseball in India

References

National baseball teams in Asia
baseball
Baseball in India